René Haby (9 October 1919, in Dombasle-sur-Meurthe – 6 February 2003) was a French politician. He had been a prisoner of war during World War II.
He was a member of the Union for French Democracy. From 28 May 1974 until 5 April 1978 he was Minister of National Education. A major reform instituted under Haby was the loi Haby that allowed students to take classes in what were called "regional languages", such as Corsican, at any stage in their education.

References 

1919 births
2003 deaths
Politicians of the French Fifth Republic
Union for French Democracy politicians
French prisoners of war in World War II
French Ministers of National Education